She's on Fire may refer to:

 She's on Fire (Amy Holland song)
 She's on Fire (Train song)
 "She's on Fire", a song by Aerosmith from Done with Mirrors